Aditi Kinkhabwala (born December 2, 1977) is an American sports journalist and sports reporter for CBS Sports.

Early life
Kinkhabwala was born in New York City. She was raised in New Jersey, and graduated from Cornell University with a degree in American Studies.

Career
Prior to joining the NFL Network, Kinkhabwala was a journalist at the San Antonio Express-News. Kinkhabwala also was a writer for The Wall Street Journal, where she covered the New York Giants football team.

Kinkhabwala just closed a 10-year tenure with NFL Network. She is a host on CBS Sports' We Need To Talk and on both Sirius XM and local Pittsburgh radio, Kinkhabwala started her journalism career in newspapers, first covering high school football at the San Antonio Express-News and college sports at  The Record in New Jersey before moving to the NFL beat at the Wall Street Journal. In April, Kinkhabwala supported Cleveland's 2021 NFL Draft coverage as a special contributor for TV, radio and website content.

References

External links
 NFL Network bio
 Instagram

 Cleveland Browns profile
 Twitter
 Instagram show page
 Twitter show page

Living people
People from Hoboken, New Jersey
People from East Brunswick, New Jersey
People from New Jersey
American television reporters and correspondents
Cornell University alumni
1977 births